Joseph Eugene Zimmer (May 16, 1912 – July 1, 1995) was an American politician from New York.

Life
He was born on May 16, 1912, in Troy, Rensselaer County, New York. He attended Public School No. 14, St. Francis School, and Troy High School.

Zimmer was a member of the New York State Assembly (Rensselaer Co., 1st D.) from 1941 to 1944, sitting in the 163rd and 164th New York State Legislatures, being the only member of the American Labor Party in both legislatures, though elected with Republican endorsement.

He died on July 1, 1995.

Sources

1912 births
1995 deaths
Politicians from Troy, New York
American Labor Party politicians
Members of the New York State Assembly
20th-century American politicians